Cercospora pulcherrima is a fungal plant pathogen.

References

puderii
Fungal plant pathogens and diseases